Ark Nova is a strategic board game for up to four people. It was designed by game designer Mathias Wigge in 2021. In Ark Nova, players aim to score conservation points by building a zoo. Upon its release, Ark Nova received positive reviews and received several awards.

Gameplay 
In Ark Nova, players strive to earn conservation points to design a modern zoo. The game is divided into informal "breaks", which are triggered once the break track reaches the last space through drawing cards. 

Players choose from five actions: drawing cards; building enclosures; playing animal cards, which requires an empty enclosure and awards the player special effects; performing an association task, which give different benefits, such as increasing reputation, adding to hand limit or reducing animal cost; and playing scoring cards, which awards points at the end of the game in addition to immediate or ongoing effects. If the player cannot or does not want to take an action, an action card is moved to the first position and an 'X token' taken.

Each action is determined by its strength, which ranges from 1 to 5. For example, the build action only allows enclosures with a maximum size of the current strength to be built. Each association task requires some threshold of strength; for example, a 2 strength is needed to increase reputation, but a 5 strength is required to gain a conservation project. At the end of each action, the exhausted action slot is moved to the far left and others are shifted right, increasing their strength. Action cards may be upgraded to give players more bonuses; for example, upgrading the build action allows the player to construct numerous enclosures. 'X tokens' can be used to increase the strength of an action, adding one strength for each X token discarded. Players can hold a maximum of five tokens at any one time.

The end of the game is triggered when any one player's conservation and appeal markers have crossed each other., and points are gained through individual final scoring cards and victory points, the latter calculated by subtracting the appeal points from the conservation points.

Reception 
Reviewing for Polygon, Keith Law noted the game's similarity to Terraforming Mars; he considered the game to be less accessible and criticised the interaction. However, Law praised the strategy, "brief turns", "careful streamlining", and money represented as only a single currency. He concluded that it is an "incredible game in just about every dimension — it’s just not the accessible title that’s going to cross into the mainstream and expand the audience". IGN listed the game as one of the best strategy games, considering the game to have a "similarly smooth blend of different mechanics" Terraforming Mars, and commented positively on its action selection system. The New York Times Wirecutter praised the game as "remarkably elegant", complimenting its turns as fast-paced and plaudited the "sprawl and scale", despite acknowledging that the latter decreases accessibility for new players; the length and theme were also critiqued.

Ark Nova received awards, including the Golden Geek award for best heavy game of the year. It was recommended by the Spiel des Jahres jury for the Kennerspiel des Jahres award, with the jury stating that "the rules are thematically accessible and easy to understand and the game develops an enormous depth over time, thanks to over 200 cards and a clever timing mechanism". The game also won the 2022 Deutscher Spiele Preis.

References

External links 
 

Board games introduced in 2021